The 1993 African Youth Championship was a football tournament hosted on the island of Mauritius, off the east coast of Africa. The Championship was won by Ghana, who defeated Cameroon in the final, with both teams thus qualifying for the 1993 FIFA World Youth Championship.

Qualification

Preliminary round
Gambia withdrew and therefore Senegal received a bye

|}

Main Round
Algeria, Cameroon, Congo, Egypt, Ethiopia, Ghana, Morocco, Nigeria, Senegal, Tunisia and Zimbabwe entered the tournament here.

|}

Teams
The following teams qualified for tournament:

 
 
 
 
  (host)

Group stage

Group A

Group B

Semifinals

Third place match

Final

Qualification to World Youth Championship
The two best performing teams qualified for the 1993 FIFA World Youth Championship.

External links
Results by RSSSF

References 

Africa U-20 Cup of Nations
Youth
1993 in youth association football
International association football competitions hosted by Mauritius